The Kittrell House is a historic house at 1103 Hickory Street in Texarkana, Arkansas.  It is a two-story Foursquare wood-frame house with a hipped roof, set on a high brick foundation.  It sits on a terraced corner lot, raised above the sidewalk level by a low wall. A full-width single-story porch extends across the main facade, supported by Ionic columns and with a balustrade of urn-shaped balusters.  The house was designed by Charles L. Thompson, a noted Arkansas architect, and built c. 1900–10.

The house was listed on the National Register of Historic Places in 1982.

See also
National Register of Historic Places listings in Miller County, Arkansas

References

Houses on the National Register of Historic Places in Arkansas
Colonial Revival architecture in Arkansas
Houses completed in 1900
Houses in Miller County, Arkansas
National Register of Historic Places in Miller County, Arkansas
Buildings and structures in Texarkana, Arkansas